Daniel Lee Redman (October 4, 1889 – April 8, 1948) was a lawyer, soldier and a Canadian federal politician.

Born in Oil City, Ontario, Redman served in the 103rd Regiment "Calgary Rifles", and then served overseas with the Canadian Expeditionary Force in the First World War.

Redman returned to Calgary and ran in the 1917 Canadian federal election as the Unionist coalition candidate in East Calgary. He ended up winning the district defeating future Member of Parliament William Irvine in a landslide.

Redman served one term in the House of Commons of Canada before retiring in 1921.

He died at Holy Cross Hospital in Calgary on April 8, 1948.

References

1889 births
1948 deaths
Members of the House of Commons of Canada from Alberta
Unionist Party (Canada) MPs
Canadian military personnel of World War I